Kitty Cats is a Canadian children’s television series created by Kristine Rosen. The show consists of a range of puppet animal characters that live in a backyard. The series was produced originally in Quebecois French for Télévision de Radio-Canada under the title Pacha et les chats and was later dubbed to English for TLC's Ready Set Learn block in the United States and TVO in Canada.

Plot
The series focused on the adventures of three animal friends: two kittens named Tango and Ricky and a puppy named Charlie. Tango and Ricky live in their own house in the country side while Charlie lives in a small cave in their backyard.

The three meet up every day and play together at the backyard of Tango and Ricky's house. Tango and Ricky's backyard also has a large tree which is the home of a bird named Flap, who is a good friend of the main characters and visits them frequently.

Along the series the main characters spend most of their time making up games and stories to act out and learn about life and friendship.

Main characters
 Tango – A female calico cat and Ricky's apparent sister.
 Ricky – A male tabby cat, and Tango's apparent brother.
 Charlie – A male puppy who goes to school with his unknown friend, Eugene.
 Flap – A multicolored bird who travels the world.
 Rosie – A female fox-like dog who is friends with the other characters.
 Willie – A mischievous hedgehog who plays pranks on his friends.

Voice Actors

Alternative Titles
 Pacha et les chats (French title)
 קיטי קט וחומי (Hebrew title)
 A Turma dos Gatos (Brazilian title)
 Gatos Rabinos (Portuguese title)
 Los Gatitos (Latin American title)
 بسابيس (Arabic title)
 Mačkići (Serbian title)
 近所の猫たち (Japanese title)

External links
 

1991 Canadian television series debuts
1995 Canadian television series endings
Canadian television shows featuring puppetry
Television shows filmed in Montreal
Canadian children's fantasy television series
1990s Canadian children's television series
Ici Radio-Canada Télé original programming
Television series about cats